Tiago Süer Barbaros Çukur (born 30 November 2002) is a professional footballer who plays for Belgian club Dender, on loan from Turkish club Fenerbahçe, as a striker. Born in the Netherlands, he represents Turkey at international level.

Early and personal life
Born in Amsterdam, Çukur has joint Dutch and Turkish nationality.

Club career
Çukur played youth football with Feyenoord and AZ Alkmaar, leaving the latter club in the summer of 2020, before signing for Watford in January 2021. He moved on loan to Doncaster Rovers in July 2021. Çukur returned to Watford on 11 January 2022, with Doncaster taking up the option to bring his loan to an end.

He signed for Turkish club Fenerbahçe in July 2022. In August 2022 he moved on loan to Belgian club Dender.

International career
Çukur is a Turkish youth international, and made his under-21s debut in the summer of 2021. He made his senior debut on 14 June 2022.

References

2002 births
Living people
Footballers from Amsterdam
Turkish footballers
Turkey international footballers
Turkey under-21 international footballers
Turkey youth international footballers
Dutch footballers
Turkish people of Dutch descent
Dutch people of Turkish descent
Citizens of Turkey through descent
Association football forwards
Feyenoord players
AZ Alkmaar players
Watford F.C. players
Doncaster Rovers F.C. players
Fenerbahçe S.K. footballers
F.C.V. Dender E.H. players
English Football League players
Turkish expatriate footballers
Dutch expatriate footballers
Turkish expatriate sportspeople in England
Dutch expatriate sportspeople in England
Expatriate footballers in England
Turkish expatriate sportspeople in Belgium
Dutch expatriate sportspeople in Belgium
Expatriate footballers in Belgium
Challenger Pro League players